Tim Baltz is an American comedian, actor, and writer. He appeared as a "citizen journalist" on the Comedy Central series The Opposition with Jordan Klepper. He currently stars on The Righteous Gemstones.

Early life
Born in Joliet, Illinois, Baltz graduated from Joliet Central High School in 1999. Baltz graduated from Loyola University Chicago. Before pursuing a career in comedy, Baltz planned on attending graduate school to study French.

Career 
Baltz began his training as a comedian at The Second City in Chicago, where he first met Jordan Klepper. In 2011, he performed in the Second City e.t.c.'s 35th revue: Sky's The Limit Weather (Weather Permitting), for which he earned a Joseph Jefferson Award. 

He also trained at the iO Theater in Chicago. He regularly appeared on the Comedy Central series Drunk History, and also made appearances on Veep, Better Call Saul, and Parks and Recreation. He also played a realtor on the Seeso series Bajillion Dollar Propertie$. 

With Ted Tremper, he co-created Shrink, a comedy TV series for which the pilot originally premiered at the New York Television Festival, where it won "Best Comedy Pilot" and the "Critics Award". In 2016, it was ordered to be made into a full series by NBC, and premiered on Seeso in March 2017. Baltz stars in the series as David Tracey, a recent graduate from medical school who, after failing to obtain a residency, decides to become a therapist instead.

Baltz has also appeared on the podcast Comedy Bang! Bang! many times as an improviser.

Filmography

Film

Television

References

External links
 

People from Joliet, Illinois
American male comedians
American male comedy actors
American male television actors
Comedians from Illinois
American comedy writers